Nam Doh-hyeong (Hangul: 남도형; Hanja: 南度亨; born 24 April 1983) is a South Korean voice actor.

At the age of 23, he began working as a voice actor after joining Korean Broadcasting System's Voice Acting Division. Shortly after, he debuted with one of the supporting roles on the digital restoration of a 1976 South Korean animated film Robot Taekwon V. In 2003, before starting his career, Nam participated in dubbing of the action video game Mobile Suit Gundam: Encounters in Space. He voiced one of the soldiers and the pilots, as a winner of a game-related event at that time.

Nam has been a freelancer since 2009. One year later, he began receiving the attention of a wide public, with his role as Jamal Malik on the Korean dub of Slumdog Millionaire. His voice could be heard also in Sid the Science Kid, Animal Detective Kiruminzoo, The Hurt Locker, The Legend of the Legendary Heroes and The Greatest. Nam's breakout work was Fairy Tail. He made a big name for himself after voicing Natsu Dragneel in the Korean dubbed Japanese television animation series. In 2012, The Lorax became his first theatrical animated film to dub a leading role. He voiced Ted Wiggins on the Korean dub of the film.

Nam made his screen debut with the 2013 film No Breathing. In the early part of the film, he could be seen performing the role of a sports commentator.

Nam has become well known for his voicing Rory Williams on the Korean dub of a British science fiction television series Doctor Who, Dent on the Korean dub of Pokémon: Best Wishes!, Raf Esquivel and Knock Out on the Korean dub of Transformers: Prime and more recently, Rigby on the Korean dub of an American animated television series Regular Show.

Career

Voice acting

TV animation dubbing

A
 Abadas (열려라 아바다스!, EBS)
 Harry
 Animal Detective Kiruminzoo (쥬로링 동물탐정, KBS)
 Hayate Chii (Chiichii on the Korean TV edition)
 Kijima Hiroo (Han Jun-ho on the Korean TV edition)
 Animal Mechanicals (변신로봇 5)
 Rex
 Amphibia (신비한 개구리 나라 앰피비아, Disney Channel Korea)
 Toadie, King Andrias Leviathan

B
 Ben 10: Omniverse (벤 10: 옴니버스, Cartoon Network Korea)
 Rook Blonko
 Beyblade: Metal Fusion (메탈 베이블레이드, Tooniverse)
 Teru Saotome
 Beyblade: Metal Masters (메탈 베이블레이드 2기, Tooniverse)
 Zeo Abyss
 Bleach (블리치, Animax)
 Menis
 Mizuiro Kojima
 Shinji Hirako
 Big City Greens (빅 시티 그린, Disney Channel Korea)
 Cricket Green

C
 A Certain Scientific Railgun (어떤 과학의 초전자포, Animax)
 Wataru Kurozuma on the episodes "Skill Out" and "Academy City"
 Coji-Coji (코지코지, Animax)
 Buhibuhi
 The Talking Snowman
 Teacher
 Crafty Kids Club (반짝반짝 발명 클럽, EBS)
 Ben
 Crash B-Daman (천하무적 크래쉬 비드맨, KBS)
 Joe Fukairi
 Cross Fight B-Daman (크로스 파이트 비드맨, Tooniverse)
 Naoya Homura (Kain on the Korean TV edition)

D
 Demon King from Today! (오늘부터 마왕!, Animax)
 King Saralegi

E
 Eggboy Koru (에그보이 코루, MBC)
 Koru
 Element Hunters (엘리먼트 헌터, KBS)
 Tom Benson

F
 Fairy Tail (페어리 테일, Champ TV)
 Natsu Dragneel
 Farm Kids (웰컴 투 동물농장, AniOne TV)
 Buster
 Fish Hooks (어항 속의 하이틴, Disney Channel Korea)
 Milo
 Franklin and Friends (꼬마 거북 프랭클린, EBS)
 Bear (Billy on the Korean TV edition)
 Mr. Beaver (Mr. Doug on the Korean TV edition)
 Mr. Fox

G
 The Garfield Show (가필드 쇼, Cartoon Network Korea)
 Jon Arbuckle
 Ghost Hound (신령사냥, Anibox TV)
 Tarō Komori
 Guardians of the Power Masks (파워 마스크, KBS)
 Yong
 The God of High School (애니플러스, Aniplus)
 Jin Mo-ri

H
 Hero: 108 (히어로 108, Cartoon Network Korea)
 Mighty Ray
 Heaven Official's Blessing (천관사복, Laftel 라프텔)
 Fu Yao

I
 Inazuma Eleven GO (썬더 일레븐 GO, JEI TV)
 Kaiji Hamano (Min Hae-jun on the Korean TV edition)
 Inazuma Eleven GO Chrono Stone (썬더 일레븐 GO 크로노스톤, JEI TV)
 Kaiji Hamano (Min Hae-jun on the Korean TV edition)
 Wonderbar (Wonderbot on the Korean TV edition)

J
 The Jungle Bunch to the Rescue (정글번치 정글수호대, Daekyo Kids TV)
 Maurice
 Al

K
 Kickoff to the Galaxy!! (은하로 킥오프!!, Animax)
 Ryūji Furuya (Namgoong Min on the Korean TV edition)
 Koong the Little Bridegroom (꼬마신랑 쿵도령, KBS)
 Woon-soe
 Kung Fu Dino Posse (쿵푸 공룡 수호대, KBS)
 Edgar Chudley (Dr. Seon-woo on the Korean TV edition)

L
 The Legend of the Legendary Heroes (마법전사 라이너, KBS)
 Calne Kaiwal
 Fiole Folkal
 Legends of Chima (키마의 전설, Cartoon Network Korea)
 Laval

 Lord of Heroes (로드 옵 히어로즈, Game)

M
 Me and My Robot (미 앤 마이 로봇, EBS)
 Joseph
 MetaJets (메타제트, KBS)
 Drew
 Miraculous: Tales of Ladybug & Cat Noir 
 Adrien Agreste/Cat Noir
 Mix Master: Final Force (최강합체 믹스마스터, KBS)
 Red Knight
 My Friend Haechi (내 친구 해치, SBS)
 Haechi
 LEGO Monkie Kid (몽키키드)
 Red Son
 Mickey Mouse Mixed-Up Adventures (미키마우스 뒤죽박죽 모험, Disney Junior Korea)
 Mickey Mouse
 Mira, Royal Detective (왕실탐정, 미라, Disney Junior Korea)
 Prince Neel

P
 The Pet Pals Present H2Ooooh! (홀리의 신비한 모험, AniOne TV)
 Pio
 Le Petit Prince (어린 왕자, EBS)
 Prince Nickel on the episode "La Planète de Jade (meaning The Planet of Jade)"
 Talamus on the episode "La Planète du Géant (meaning The Planet of the Giant)"
 Phi Brain: Puzzle of God (파이 브레인: 신의 퍼즐, JEI TV)
 Freecell
 Souji Jikugawa (Ji So-rim on the Korean TV edition)
 Phineas and Ferb (피니와 퍼브, Disney Channel Korea)
 Phineas Flynn
 PomPom and His Friends (피들리 팜, EBS)
 Andy
 Pirates: Adventures in Art (출발! 모나리자호 미술 탐험대, KBS)
 Fresco del Gecko
 Planet Sheen (우주 모험 플래닛 쉰, Nickelodeon Korea)
 Pinter
 Pokémon: Best Wishes! (포켓몬스터 베스트 위시, Tooniverse)
 Dent
 Pretty Rhythm: Dear My Future (꿈의 보석 프리즘스톤, SBS)
 Don Bombie
 Jun Takigawa (Jun on the Korean TV edition)
 The Prince of Tennis (테니스의 왕자, Tooniverse)
 Kiyosumi Sengoku

R
 Ready Jet Go! (우주탐험가 젯, EBS)
 Jet Propulsion
 Jet 2
 Zerk
 Regular Show (레귤러 쇼, Cartoon Network Korea)
 Rigby
 Rob the Robot (로보의 별나라 여행, EBS)
 Orbit (Koong-kwang on the Korean TV edition)
 Robocar Poli (로보카 폴리, EBS)
 Bruner
 Marine
 Mr. Wheeler
 Robot Trains (로봇트레인, SBS)
 Kay
 Ruler of Nabari (닌자의 왕, Animax)
 Kouichi Aizawa

S
 Sanrio Boys (산리오 남자, KBS kids)
 Yu Mizuno
 Sid the Science Kid (꼬마 과학자 시드, KBS)
 Sid
 Sidekick (사이드킥, Cartoon Network Korea)
 Eric Needles
 Star vs. the Forces of Evil (프린세스 스타의 모험일기, Disney Channel Korea)
 Marco Ubaldo Diaz

T
 Team Umizoomi (수학특공대 우미주미, EBS)
 Bot
 Twittering Birds Never Fly~The Clouds Gather (지저귀는 새는 날지 않는다, Laftel)
 Yashiro
 Transformers: Prime (트랜스포머 프라임, EBS)
 Knock Out
 Raf Esquivel
 Skyquake

U
 Ultimate Spider-Man (스파이더 맨, Disney Channel Korea)
 Spider-Man/Peter Parker

V
 Vipo (하늘을 나는 비포, JEI TV)
 Henry

W
 Wedding Peach (웨딩피치, Tooniverse)
 Takuro Amano (Peter on the Korean TV edition)

Y
 Yu-Gi-Oh! Zexal (유희왕 제알, Champ TV)
 Esper Robin
 Your Lie in April (4월은 너의 거짓말, Blueray Ver)
 Ryōta Watari

Z
 Zoobles! (쥬블스, SBS)
 Pom

Animated movie dubbing

2000s

2010s

Film dubbing

0-9
 16 Wishes (16세의 소원, Disney Channel Korea)
 Cainan Wiebe as Mike Jensen

B
 Bodyguards and Assassins (8인: 최후의 결사단, KBS)
 Wang Po-chieh as Li Chongguang

C
 The Chronicles of Narnia: The Voyage of the Dawn Treader (나니아 연대기: 새벽 출정호의 항해, Korean-dubbed edition in theaters)
 Will Poulter as Eustace Scrubb

D
 Defiance (디파이언스, In-Flight Movie Edition)
 Jamie Bell as Asael Bielski
 The Departed (디파티드, KBS)
 Kevin Corrigan as Sean Costigan

G
 The Greatest (그레이티스트, KBS)
 Johnny Simmons as Ryan Brewer

H
 He's Just Not That Into You (그는 당신에게 반하지 않았다, In-Flight Movie Edition)
 Justin Long as Alex
 Hear Me (청설, KBS)
 Eddie Peng as Tian Kuo
 Hook (후크, KBS)
 Dante Basco as Rufio
 The Hurt Locker (허트 로커, KBS)
 Brian Geraghty as Specialist Owen Eldrich

I
 Identity (아이덴티티, KBS)
 William Lee Scott as Louisiana

K
 The King's Speech (킹스 스피치, KBS)
 Dominic Applewhite as Valentine Logue

L
 The Legend of Ip Man (엽문, KBS)
 Calvin Cheng as Chow Kwong-yiu

N
 New York, I Love You (뉴욕 아이 러브 유, KBS)
 Anton Yelchin as the Boy in the Park (on the "Brett Ratner" segment)
 Night of the Living Dead 3D (살아 있는 시체들의 밤)
 Joshua DesRoces as Ben

O
 Ocean's Eleven (오션스 일레븐, KBS)
 Casey Affleck as Virgil Malloy

S
 Sense and Sensibility (센스 앤 센서빌러티, KBS)
 Hugh Grant as Edward Ferrars
 Sharpay's Fabulous Adventure (샤페이의 멋진 모험, Disney Channel Korea)
 Austin Butler as Peyton Leverett
 Slumdog Millionaire (슬럼독 밀리어네어, KBS)
 Dev Patel as Jamal Malik

T
 The Twilight Saga: Eclipse (이클립스, KBS)
 Boo Boo Stewart as Seth Clearwater

U
 Under the Same Moon (언더 더 쎄임 문, KBS)
 Jesse Garcia as David

W
 Welcome (웰컴, KBS)
 Firat Ayverdi as Bilal Kayani

Foreign soap opera dubbing

C
 Cold Case (콜드 케이스, KBS)
 Cory Hardrict as Officer Joe Washington on the episode "The Runner"

D
 Doctor Who 2008–10 specials (닥터 후 스페셜, KBS)
 Michael Goldsmith as Roman Groom on the episode "The Waters of Mars"
 Doctor Who (닥터 후, KBS)
 Arthur Darvill as Rory Williams

F
 Falling Skies (폴링 스카이, KBS)
 Connor Jessup as Ben Mason
 Daniyah Ysrayl as Rick Thompson

H
 H2O: Just Add Water (H2O, Nickelodeon Korea)
 Christopher Poree as Byron
 Hannah Montana (한나 몬타나, Disney Channel Korea)
 Drew Osborne as Willis

K
 Kaizoku Sentai Gokaiger (파워레인저 캡틴포스, Champ TV)
 Gai Ikari/Gokai Silver (Bak Jae-min on the Korean TV edition)

M
 Masked Rider W (가면라이더 더블, Champ TV)
 Gong Teyu as Jun Kazu (Cha Myeong-seok on the Korean TV edition)

O
 Orphan Black (오펀 블랙, KBS)
 Jordan Gavaris as Felix Dawkins

P
 Primeval (프라이미벌: 원시의 습격, KBS)
 Mark Wakeling as Captain Tom Ryan

R
 Rescue Fire (긴급출동 레스큐 파이어, JEI TV)
 Tatsuya Homura (Hero on the Korean TV edition)
 Revenge (리벤지, KBS)
 Connor Paolo as Declan Porter

S
 Sherlock (셜록, KBS)
 James Duncan as Jimmy
 Sinbad (신드바드, KBS)
 Dimitri Leonidas as Anwar
 Supah Ninjas (슈파닌자, Nickelodeon Korea)
 Tyler Poelle as Dollhouse

T
 Taylor's DNA (테일러는 열두 살, EBS)
 Luke Erceg as Leon Lipowski
 The Troop (더 트룹, Nickelodeon Korea)
 Matt Shively as Kirby Bancroft-Cadworth III
 Three Kingdoms (삼국지, KBS)
 Nie Yuan as Zhao Yun
 True Jackson (트루 잭슨, Nickelodeon Korea)
 Matt Shively as Ryan Laserbeam

W
 Wizards of Waverly Place (우리 가족 마법사, Disney Channel Korea)
 David Henrie as Justin Russo

Narrations
 The Most Beautiful Journey in the World (세상에서 가장 아름다운 여행, SBS)
 Network Hometown (네트워크 현장 고향이 보인다, SBS)
 Our Sole Earth (하나뿐인 지구, EBS)
 Treasures of Ancient Rome (고대 로마의 미술을 말하다, KBS)
 Alastair Sooke

Commercial film dubbing
 Kellogg's Chex Choco (켈로그 첵스 초코)
 One of the Chexes (The one wearing eyeglasses)

Video game dubbing
 AFTER L!FE (에프터라이프)
Louis
Apex Legends (에이펙스 레전드)
Octane
ArKnights (명일방주)
SilverAsh
Buried Stars (베리드 스타즈)
Seo Hyesung 
CLOSERS (클로저스)
David Lee
Cookie Run: Kingdom (쿠키런: 킹덤)
 Madeleine Cookie
Cyberpunk 2077 (사이버펑크 2077)
SKIPPY
Cyphers (사이퍼즈)
Ryan Hart
Destiny 2 (데스티니 가디언즈)
Ghost
Dota 2 (도타 2)
 Venomancer
Dungeon & Fighter (던전 앤 파이터)
 Male Wizard
ELSWORD (엘소드)
Theodore
Epic Seven (에픽세븐)
Vildred, Zerato, Khawazu
EXOS HEROES (엑소스 히어로즈)
Zeon
Final Fantasy 14 (파이널 판타지 14)
Zenos yae Galvus
 Genshin Impact 
 Childe
GRANSAGA (그랑사가)
Gerthion, Khan, Silvano, Tsubasa
I Don't Want This Kind of Hero (이런 영웅은 싫어)
Dune
 League of Legends (리그 오브 레전드)
 Jayce (The Defender of Tomorrow)
Rakan, the Charmer
MapleStory (메이플스토리)
 Ho Young
 Mobile Suit Gundam: Encounters in Space (기동전사 건담: 해후의 우주)
 One of the soldiers and the pilots
Nameless
Yeonho
Onmyoji (음양사)
Yamawaro, Kubinashi
RingFit Adventure (링 피트 어드벤처)
Ring
Seven Knights (세븐나이츠)
Spike
Soulworker (소울워커)
Victor
 Star Project Online (스타 프로젝트 온라인)
 Choi Jun-woo
Talesweaver (테일즈위버)
Maximin Liebkne
The War of Genesis 4 (창세기전4)
Lacid Pandragon
World of Warcraft (월드 오브 워크래프트)
Jojo Ironbrow, Ariden, Thoradin

TV appearances

Film appearance

Miscellaneous facts
 The ending title for the Korean dub of Transformers: Prime is based upon a video shot by Goo Ja-hyeong (South Korean voice actor), who dubbed Megatron on the show. The title aired only when the first season of the show ended. In this video, Nam appears for a moment, with a scene in which Raf Esquivel is running.

See also
 Korean Broadcasting System

References

External links
 Nam Doh-hyeong's profile on KBS Voice 
 Silvery Voice: The official fan club of Nam Doh-hyeong 
 

1983 births
Living people
South Korean male voice actors